Lasker is a town in Northampton County, North Carolina, United States. The population was 122 at the 2010 census. It is part of the Roanoke Rapids, North Carolina Micropolitan Statistical Area.

Geography

Education

Lasker has one private school in the town, called Northeast Academy.

Demographics

As of the census of 2000, there were 103 people, 48 households, and 33 families residing in the town. The population density was 81.9 people per square mile (31.6/km2). There were 58 housing units at an average density of 46.1 per square mile (17.8/km2). The racial makeup of the town was 88.35% White and 11.65% African American.

There were 48 households, out of which 27.1% had children under the age of 18 living with them, 58.3% were married couples living together, 6.3% had a female householder with no husband present, and 31.3% were non-families. 29.2% of all households were made up of individuals, and 12.5% had someone living alone who was 65 years of age or older. The average household size was 2.15 and the average family size was 2.61.

In the town, the population was spread out, with 19.4% under the age of 18, 4.9% from 18 to 24, 27.2% from 25 to 44, 27.2% from 45 to 64, and 21.4% who were 65 years of age or older. The median age was 44 years. For every 100 females there were 87.3 males. For every 100 females age 18 and over, there were 76.6 males.

The median income for a household in the town was $31,607, and the median income for a family was $31,875. Males had a median income of $31,250 versus $18,125 for females. The per capita income for the town was $51,432. There were 10.0% of families and 10.1% of the population living below the poverty line, including 30.0% of under eighteens and none of those over 64.

Notable person 
Chris Daughtry — singer/songwriter, known as the lead vocalist and rhythm guitarist for the rock band Daughtry

References

External links
 Lasker Summer Music Festival
 Lasker, North Carolina is at coordinates .

Towns in Northampton County, North Carolina
Towns in North Carolina
Roanoke Rapids, North Carolina micropolitan area